Coreanomecon is a monotypic genus of flowering plants belonging to the family Papaveraceae. Its native range is Korea. It contains only a single species, Coreanomecon hylomeconoides.

References

Papaveraceae
Monotypic Papaveraceae genera